The Hayes site (3 AR 37) is an archaeological site located next to Bayou Meto in Arkansas County, Arkansas. It was inhabited by peoples of the Plum Bayou culture (650–1050 CE), in a time known as the Late Woodland period.

Description
The site consisted of four platform mounds with a plaza. The site has not been excavated but ceramics typical of the Plum Bayou culture have been found at the site.

See also
 Baytown Site
 Coy Site 
 Toltec Mounds

References

External links

Plum Bayou culture
Archaeological sites in Arkansas
Geography of Arkansas County, Arkansas
Mounds in Arkansas